The Children’s Museum of Manhattan is located on the Upper West Side of Manhattan in New York City. It was founded by Bette Korman, under the name GAME (Growth Through Art and Museum Experience), in 1973. The museum became the Children’s Museum of Manhattan in the 1980s and moved to its current location on West 83rd Street in 1989. In 2018, the museum announced a plan to relocate to a larger space on 96th Street and Central Park West.

History

Subsequent to its founding as GAME (Growth Through Art and Museum Experience), in 1973,  With New York City in a deep fiscal crisis, and school art, music, and cultural programs eliminated, a loosely organized, group of artists and educators set up a basement storefront to serve Harlem and the Upper West Side.   With a challenge grant from the National Endowment for the Arts, a city-owned courthouse was renovated into a small exhibition, studio, and workshop and renamed the Manhattan Laboratory Museum.
The museum expanded exhibit and programming space adding a media center, an outdoor environmental center and an early childhood center. CMOM’s visibility and audience grew with the World of Pooh exhibit, created through a partnership with Disney.  Wordplay, the first exhibit designed specifically for children 4 and younger opened.  CMOM’s Executive Director, Andy Ackerman, served as president of the Association of Children’s Museum’s and hosted the 1999 ACM annual conference. In 2000, CMOM completed construction to add a new entrance, lobby, and supplement exhibit space.

In 2005, it was among 406 New York City arts and social service institutions to receive part of a $20 million grant from the Carnegie Corporation, which was made possible through a donation by New York City mayor Michael Bloomberg.

In 2019, Andrew Ackerman, the museum's director for nearly thirty years stepped down. Aileen Hefferren is Director as of 2021.

As of 2021, it reaches approximately 350,000 visitors a year at the museum, an increase of 25,000 over the prior decade. It was also one of the founding organizations of the New York City Museum School, part of its outreach efforts that date back to its founding as a community organization.

Central Park West building
In January 2018, the Museum announced that it had acquired the former First Church of Christ, Scientist building at 96th Street and Central Park West, and planned to move to the new facility after making renovations.  The Museum hopes to move into the new building, which will have 41,300 square feet for galleries and exhibitions, in 2023.

References

External links

 Museum website

Children's museums in New York City
Museums in Manhattan
Upper West Side